Zodarion modestum is a spider species found in Spain.

See also 
 List of Zodariidae species

References

External links 

modestum
Spiders of Europe
Spiders described in 1870